Fred. Olsen Cruise Lines is a UK-based, Norwegian-owned cruise shipping line with four cruise ships. The company is owned by Bonheur and Ganger Rolf and is headquartered in Ipswich, Suffolk, in the United Kingdom. The company is part of the Fred. Olsen Group.

History
The company originated in Hvitsten, a small town on Oslofjord in Norway, in 1848 by three Olsen brothers, Fredrik Christian, Petter and Andras, who bought their first ships and began an international shipping company. The company is now into the fifth generation of the family and operates various companies skilled within the cruise and passenger shipping trade, as well as aviation, ships' crewing, ship building and offshore industries. The Fred. Olsen group also has business interests in the luxury hotel sector, estate management, property development and electronics companies.

In May 2006 Fred. Olsen Cruise Lines announced the purchase of a new vessel, Norwegian Crown, from Norwegian Cruise Line. Following delivery of the vessel in November 2007, she was dry-docked for refurbishment and lengthening, with a pre-built 30 metre centre section added. She was renamed Balmoral and entered service early in 2008. This was followed by the extension of Braemar in summer 2008.

In 2018 Fred. Olsen announced that a series of 600-passenger-newbuilts is planned and they are in negotiating with shipyards, but those newbuilds were never ordered.

In July 2020, Fred. Olsen bought the former Holland America Line ships Amsterdam and Rotterdam for $37m and renamed them Bolette and Borealis 
respectively, they will be delivered in September 2020. They will replace the Boudicca and the Black Watch, which were retired in August 2020.

Fleet

Current fleet

Former fleet

Destinations and cruise holidays
For most of the year, the ships are based in UK ports. A winter Caribbean fly-cruise programme on Braemar operates from Barbados.

Destinations include Northern Europe, the Baltic, the Mediterranean, the Adriatic, the Canary Islands, the Caribbean, Africa, Canada, the United States and South America

Operations

Fred.

References

External links

 Fred. Olsen Cruise Lines official website
  Fakta om Fartyg: Fred. Olsen (covers ships of all Fred. Olsen brands, past and present)
 Cruisepage.com Review
 Photos of Black Watch and other Fred Olsen cruise ships
 Photos of the current Fred. Olsen Cruises fleet

Shipping companies of Norway
Cruise lines
Fred. Olsen & Co.
Companies based in Suffolk
Transport companies established in 1848
Norwegian companies established in 1848